The 1992 Virginia Slims of Philadelphia was a women's tennis tournament played on indoor carpet courts at the Philadelphia Civic Center in Philadelphia, Pennsylvania in the United States that was part of the Tier II category of the 1992 WTA Tour. It was the 10th edition of the tournament and was held from November 9 through November 15, 1992. First-seeded Steffi Graf won the singles title and earned $70,000 first-prize money.

Finals

Singles
 Steffi Graf defeated  Arantxa Sánchez Vicario 6–3, 3–6, 6–1
 It was Graf's 8th singles title of the year and the 69th of her career.

Doubles
 Gigi Fernández /  Natasha Zvereva defeated  Conchita Martínez /  Mary Pierce 6–1, 6–3

References

External links
 ITF tournament edition details
 Tournament draws

Virginia Slims of Philadelphia
Advanta Championships of Philadelphia
Virginia Slims of Philadelphia
Virginia Slims of Philadelphia
Virginia Slims of Philadelphia